Igor Picușceac (born 27 March 1983) is a Moldovan football coach and a former player who played as a striker. He is an assistant coach with the Kazakhstani club Turan.

International career
Picușceac scored his first goal for Moldova in a 2–1 defeat to Israel in a 2010 FIFA World Cup qualifier match. Scored in 47th second of match, this is the fastest goal ever scored by Moldova in any match.

Coaching career
In October 2020 he was hired as a manager of FC Akron Tolyatti.

Honours
Sheriff Tiraspol
Divizia Națională Champion: 2008/2009
Moldovan Cup: 2008/2009

International goals

References

External links

 

 

1983 births
Living people
People from Tiraspol
Moldovan footballers
Moldovan expatriate footballers
Moldova international footballers
FC Sheriff Tiraspol players
Moldovan Super Liga players
FC Tiraspol players
FC Krasnodar players
FC Amkar Perm players
Russian Premier League players
China League One players
Expatriate footballers in China
Expatriate footballers in Russia
Moldovan football managers
Moldovan expatriate football managers
Expatriate football managers in Russia
Association football forwards